Pan Shin-yu (born 3 May 1997) is a Taiwanese footballer who plays as a defender for Taiwan Mulan Football League club Taichung Blue Whale and the Chinese Taipei women's national team.

International career
Pan Shin-yu represented Chinese Taipei at the 2013 AFC U-16 Women's Championship and the 2015 AFC U-19 Women's Championship. She capped at senior level during the 2018 Asian Games and the 2020 AFC Women's Olympic Qualifying Tournament.

International goals
Scores and results list Chinese Taipei's goal tally first.

References

1997 births
Living people
Women's association football defenders
Taiwanese women's footballers
Footballers from Kaohsiung
Chinese Taipei women's international footballers
Asian Games competitors for Chinese Taipei
Footballers at the 2018 Asian Games